Foulden  is a village and civil parish in the English county of Norfolk.

History
Foulden's name is of Anglo-Saxon origin and derives from the Old English for a hill with an abundance of domesticated birds.

In the Domesday Book, Foulden is listed as a settlement of 64 households located in the hundred of South Greenhoe. In 1086, the village was divided between the East Anglian estates of Alan of Brittany, William de Warenne and Walter Giffard.

Foulden Hall is a sixteenth-century moated manor-house located within the parish boundaries. The house was updated with a Victorian facade in the nineteenth century.

In November 1981, Foulden was struck by an F0/T1 tornado, as part of the record-breaking nationwide tornado outbreaks at the time.

Geography
According to the 2011 Census, Foulden has a population of 430 residents living in 180 households.

Foulden falls within the constituency of South West Norfolk and is represented in Parliament by Liz Truss of the Conservative Party. For the purposes of local government, the parish falls within the district of Breckland.

The River Wissey runs roughly west to east through the parish and the modern village sits overlooking the valley. Around the river some areas of fen (known as Borough Fen) survive and Foulden Common, a Site of Special Scientific Interest, is a large expanse of land in the north of the parish. Some of the parish is now planted with conifers and is part of Thetford Forest, managed by the Forestry Commission.

All Saints' Church
Foulden's parish church was heavily restored in the nineteenth century, with the original church tower collapsing at some point during the eighteenth century. The interior of All Saints' dates to the thirteenth and fourteenth centuries, with a fifteenth-century dado that was vandalised in the sixteenth century by Puritan iconoclasts.

Amenities
Foulden village hall was built in the 1970s by the residents of the village and is available for private hire.

Notable people
 John Lawley (1859-1922), Commissioner of the Salvation Army

References

External links

Villages in Norfolk
Breckland District
Civil parishes in Norfolk